Hristo Zlatinski (born 22 January 1985) is a Bulgarian professional footballer, who currently plays in the Bulgarian Third League with Lokomotiv Plovdiv II.

Career
Zlatinski started his career in his home town Blagoevgrad in the local team Pirin. In 2005, he joined Lokomotiv Plovdiv. For two years in Plovdiv he played in 46 matches and scored 4 goals. In this period Zlatinski played also for the Bulgaria national under-21 football team. In June 2007 he signed for three years with Lokomotiv Sofia.
In 2010 Zlatinski returned to Lokomotiv Plovdiv.

At 18 June 2013, he joined Bulgarian champion Ludogorets Razgrad. During the 2013/2014 UEFA Europa League, he scored two goals with long-distance efforts - in the 1:0 win over Chernomorets Odessa and on 27 February 2014, in the 3:3 draw with S.S. Lazio. He became 3rd captain of the side and one of the leaders in the changing room. For entire season Zlatinski scored 12 goals in all competitions.

International career
Zlatinski received his first call-up to the senior team in Mihail Madanski's first game in charge of Bulgaria in October 2011. On 7 October he made his Bulgaria debut in a 3–0 friendly loss against Ukraine.

Personal life
He is married to Vanya. They have two children - a daughter named Elia and a younger son Christian.

Club

National team

Honours
Ludogorets
 Bulgarian A Group: 2013–14, 2014–15
 Bulgarian Cup: 2013–14
 Bulgarian Supercup: 2014
Universitatea Craiova
Cupa României: 2017–18
Supercupa României runner-up: 2018

References

External links
 
 
 

1985 births
Living people
People from Gotse Delchev
Bulgarian footballers
Association football midfielders
OFC Pirin Blagoevgrad players
PFC Lokomotiv Plovdiv players
FC Lokomotiv 1929 Sofia players
PFC Ludogorets Razgrad players
CS Universitatea Craiova players
FC Steaua București players
FC Botev Vratsa players
First Professional Football League (Bulgaria) players
Liga I players
Bulgarian expatriate footballers
Expatriate footballers in Romania
Bulgaria international footballers
Bulgaria under-21 international footballers
Sportspeople from Blagoevgrad Province